Serenity is the fifth album by Blood for Blood, and was released on June 22, 2004.

The cover features a building in the Bunker Hill Housing Development. It is the largest housing project in the City of Boston, and it is located in Rob Lind's home neighborhood of Charlestown.

Track listing
 A Prayer to the Night Sky
 Serenity
 Hanging on the Corner
 Live the Lie
 A Rock 'n' Roll Song
 My Jesus Mercy
 Runaway (Del Shannon cover)
 City Boy
 Serenity (Reprise)

References

2004 albums
Blood for Blood albums